The 1972 San Francisco State Gators football team represented California State University, San Francisco—now known as San Francisco State University—as a member of the Far Western Conference (FWC) during the 1972 NCAA College Division football season. Led by 12th-year head coach Vic Rowen, San Francisco State compiled an overall record of 3–8 with a mark of 1–4 in conference play, tying for fifth place in the FWC. For the season the team was outscored by its opponents 323 to 250. The Gators played home games at Cox Stadium in San Francisco.

Schedule

References

San Francisco State
San Francisco State Gators football seasons
San Francisco State Gators football